Angikuni Lake (variant: Lake Anjikuni) is a lake in Kivalliq Region, Nunavut, Canada. It is one of several lakes located along the Kazan River; Ennadai Lake is to the south and Yathkyed Lake is to the north.

Geography
The lake's shore is notable for rocky outcroppings of the Precambrian Shield, being part of the Hearne Domain, Western Churchill province of the Churchill Craton.

Fauna
Barren-ground Caribou migrate through the area. The lake contains Lake trout, Northern pike, and Arctic grayling.

Ethnography
During his 1948 trip, Canadian explorer Farley Mowat arrived at Angikuni Lake, then part of the Northwest Territories, and found a cairn constructed in a fashion not normally used by area Inuit. It contained pieces of a hardwood flattened box with dovetailed corners. Mowat, knowing that only one other European explorer, Samuel Hearne, had been in this region previously (in 1770), speculated that the monument was built by Francis Crozier, who, as a member of the lost expedition originally led by Sir John Franklin, vanished in 1848 during the ill-fated search for the Northwest Passage.

Legend of the vanishing village 

In 1930, a newsman in The Pas, Manitoba reported on a small Inuit village right off of Lake Angikuni. The village had always welcomed the fur trappers who passed through occasionally. But in 1930 Joe Labelle, a fur trapper well known in the village, found that all the villagers had gone. He found unfinished shirts that still had needles in them and food hanging over fire pits and therefore concluded that the villagers had left suddenly. Even more disturbing, he found seven sled dogs dead from starvation and a grave that had been dug up. Labelle knew that an animal could not have been responsible because the stones circling the grave were undisturbed. He reported this to the North-West Mounted Police, who conducted a search for the missing people; no one was ever found.

Such is the story as it appears in Frank Edwards's 1959 book Stranger than Science; other versions appear in Whitley Strieber's science fiction novel Majestic and Dean Koontz's horror novel Phantoms. The World's Greatest UFO Mysteries (presented as fact) has an even more detailed version, as do other websites and books, adding other standard details such as mysterious lights in the sky, empty graveyards, and over a thousand people missing. A reprint of the story is found in the November 27, 1930 Danville Bee, written by journalist Emmett E. Kelleher. That article states that Joe Labelle found an empty Eskimo camp with 6 tents and that 25 men, women and children had vanished.

After the article was reported in Canadian newspapers, the NWMP received inquiries. In January 1931, Sergeant J. Nelson, stationed in The Pas, filed an internal report that was released to the public. Nelson wrote  he could find "no foundation for this story." Nelson reported that Joe Labelle, the informant, had taken out his first trapping license that season and questioned whether he had been in the territories previously as stated in the Kelleher article. Nelson continued, dating one of the photos used in the story to 1909 and stating that Kelleher was known for "colorful stories." The incident appears to have been forgotten until referenced by Edwards's 1959 book.

The RCMP (modern day version of the North-West Mounted Police) has since dismissed the case as an urban legend, claiming that the story originated in Frank Edwards' book. The RCMP also states, "It is also believed that such a large village would never have been possible in such a remote area." The RCMP states that it has no record of any unusual activity in the area.

Brian Dunning debunked the claims in an episode of Skeptoid, although he updated his findings to report that he uncovered the existence of the November 1930 Emmett E. Kelleher article, believing there were no such references and that the story originated with the 1959 Edwards book (which he admits is incorrect). While he still cites Kelleher's story as "dubious", he also states that despite this, the published article "does indeed exist."

Notes

References

 
 Latta, Jeffrey Blair. The Franklin Conspiracy Cover-Up, Betrayal, and the Astonishing Secret Behind the Lost Arctic Expedition. Toronto: Hounslow Press, 2001. Excerpt from Google Books 
 Woodman, David C. Unravelling the Franklin Mystery Inuit Testimony. McGill-Queen's native and northern series, 5. Montreal: McGill-Queen's University Press, 1991. Excerpt from Google Books 

Lakes of Kivalliq Region
Urban legends